Gross loan is the total amount of issued credits given to banks during the accounting period. Liquidity of the bank can be judged upon the amount of its gross loans. Liquidity of the credit institutions is directly related to the refinancing needs.

Gross loan is the total amount of loans, refinanced by credit institutions subject to the Central Bank. The Central Bank, as the lender of last resort, provides loans (credits) to commercial banks and other credit institutions, when the banks themselves have completely depleted their internal resources and are unable to maintain their solvency through other means. The Central Bank gives loans to commercial banks at the refinancing interest rate, which is minimal and may vary, depending on the type of services the given bank provides.

See also
Gross domestic product
Gross national product
Gross profit
Gross income

Banking
National accounts
Loans